Coleophora salicivorella is a moth of the family Coleophoridae. It is found in Canada, including Ontario.

The larvae feed on the leaves of Salix species. They create a composite leaf case.

References

salicivorella
Moths of North America
Moths described in 1945